Lee Seong-ae (born 2 December 1962) is a South Korean speed skater. She competed in three events at the 1980 Winter Olympics.

References

External links
 

1962 births
Living people
South Korean female speed skaters
Olympic speed skaters of South Korea
Speed skaters at the 1980 Winter Olympics
People from Chuncheon
Sportspeople from Gangwon Province, South Korea
20th-century South Korean women